Victoria Vale is a rural locality in the Shire of Croydon, Queensland, Australia.

Geography
The Norman River forms part of the south-eastern boundary before flowing through to the west. The Clara River, a tributary of the Norman, flows through from north-east to north.

Road infrastructure
The Richmond–Croydon Road crosses the south-eastern and north-eastern corners.

References 

Shire of Croydon
Localities in Queensland